Kleisti is a neighbourhood of Riga, the capital of Latvia. It is the largest neighbourhood of Riga by area, although sparsely populated. Most of the neighbourhood is woods and overgrown meadows.

The name of the neighbourhood comes from the former Kleisti Manor (Kleiste).

Neighbourhoods in Riga